Surakarta is a city in Indonesia.

Surakarta may also refer to:
 Surakarta Sunanate, a kingdom in Central Java, Indonesia.
 Surakarta (game), Indonesian strategy board game